Underemployed is an American comedy-drama television series on MTV. The series premiered on October 16, 2012 and ended on January 12, 2013.

Premise
The series evolves around a group of five fresh graduates who met and became close friends during college.

Initially, each had their big dreams and were very determined to make them happen: Lou wanted to pursue graduate school and eventually become an environmental lawyer; Raviva broke up with Lou to move to Los Angeles in the hope of making it in the music industry; Miles wanted to be a model and the face of Calvin Klein; Sophia wanted to become a writer; and Daphne just wanted to be successful.

Unfortunately, life doesn't always work out.

Cast

Main
 Michelle Ang as Sophia Swanson
 Diego Boneta as Miles Gonzalez
 Sarah Habel as Daphne Glover
 Jared Kusnitz as Louis "Lou" Craft
 Inbar Lavi as Raviva

Recurring
 Julianna Guill as Bekah
 Rachel Cannon as Deb
 Daniel Johnson as Jamel
 Danny McCarthy as Paul
 Olesya Rulin as Pixie Dexter
 Bar Paly as Tatiana
 Charlie Weber as Todd
 Angel M. Wainwright as Laura

Episodes

Critical reception
The Chicago Tribune said the show needs to offer a lot more than what was served in the first few episodes to compete on the level of Girls on HBO and Workaholics on Comedy Central. The New York Times said the show is a botched attempt at a dirty-sexy-funny show.

References

External links
 
 Underemployed on TV.com

2010s American comedy-drama television series
2012 American television series debuts
2013 American television series endings
English-language television shows
MTV original programming
Television shows set in Chicago